Durikainema is a genus of two nematodes in the family Robertdollfusiidae. Species have a head with a cuticular cephalic inflation, elongated papillae and amphids, and well-developed musculature. Characteristics of the males include a single spicule and a long attenuated tail. Durikainema species parasitize macropods. The genus was circumscribed in 1982 with the type species Durikainema macropi, a parasite of the eastern grey kangaroo (Macropus giganteus). D. phascolarcti, parasite of the koala (Phascolarctos cinereus), was described in 1998.

References 

Enoplea
Enoplea genera
Parasitic nematodes of mammals
Parasites of marsupials
Nematodes described in 1982